Chalybeate waters are mineral spring waters containing salts of iron.

Chalybeate may also refer to:
Chalybeate, Kentucky
Chalybeate, Mississippi

See also
Chalybeate Springs (disambiguation)